Gia 'sena ton agnosto (Greek: Για 'σένα τον άγνωστο; For you, the unknown) is the name of a studio album by popular Greek singer Marinella. It was released on September 27, 1983, by PolyGram Records in Greece and it went gold selling over 50,000 units. The album is entirely composed by Giorgos Hatzinasios, with lyrics by Michalis Bourboulis. The original release was in stereo on vinyl and cassette, under the label of Philips Records. In 1996, the album was released on CD by PolyGram, under the label of Mercury Records.

Track listing 
Side One.
 "Eise potami" (Είσαι ποτάμι; You are a river) – 3:34
 "Mi me rotas" (Μη με ρωτάς; Don't ask me) – 3:20
 "Echo psychi" (Έχω ψυχή; I have a soul) – 2:32
 "Kamia fora" (Καμιά φορά; Sometimes) – 3:16
 "Mesimeraki" (Μεσημεράκι; Little noon) – 2:36
 "Ta simata" (Τα σήματα; The signals) – 1:51
Side Two.
 "O agnostos (Gia 'sena ton agnosto)" (Ο άγνωστος; The unknown) – 2:44
 "Erotas anatolitis" (Έρωτας ανατολίτης; Love oriental) – 3:32
 "Stin odo Kallidromiou" (Στην οδό Καλλιδρομίου; At Kallidromiou street) – 2:46
 "Enas anthropos zestos" (Ένας άνθρωπος ζεστός; A warm man) – 3:08
 "Forages ton ilio" (Φόραγες τον ήλιο; You wore the sunshine) – 2:47
 "Ta simata (Instrumental)" (Τα σήματα; The signals) – 1:51

Personnel 
 Marinella – vocals, background vocals
 Philippos Papatheodorou – producer
 Giorgos Hatzinasios – arranger, conductor
 Yiannis Smyrneos – recording engineer
 Dinos Diamantopoulos – photographer
 Petros Paraschis – artwork

References

1983 albums
Greek-language albums
Marinella albums
Universal Music Greece albums